Amabutho is the first album by the South African isicathamiya group Ladysmith Black Mambazo. It was released in 1973 by Gallo Record Company. Amabutho was the first record by black musicians in the country to receive gold disc certification (25,000 copies). It contains the hit single "Nomathemba". The LP was reissued on Gallo (in South Africa only) along with most of the group's early output, in February 2007. The members who sang on the Amabutho album were Milton Mazibuko, Ngali Mazibuko, Joseph Shabalala, Headman Shabalala, Enoch Shabalala, Albert Mazibuko and Walter Malinga

Track listing
 "Amabutho" (Warriors)
 "Isigcino" (The End)
 "Yadla Yabeletha" (It Eats Often)
 "Awu, Wemadoda" (Hey, Man!)
 "Mlaba" Thanks 
 "Ushaka" (King Shaka)
 "Nomathemba" (Hope)
 "Nqonqotha Mfana" (The Boy Knocks)
 " Sivuya Sonke we perform everywhere 
 Nkosi Yamakhosi Kings of Kings /Lord of Lords 
 " Utugela the tugela River 
 "Ngelekelele" help me

References

1973 debut albums
Ladysmith Black Mambazo albums